Torchon lace (Dutch: stropkant) is a bobbin lace that was made all over Europe. It is continuous, with the pattern made at the same time as the ground. Torchon lace is notable for being coarse and strong, as well as its simple geometric patterns and straight lines. It does not use representational designs. Torchon lace was used by the middle classes for edging or insertion, and also to trim cotton and linen underwear, where it was ideal because of its strength and because it was inexpensive. Torchon lace was originally made from flax, but cotton is used as well, and has been for a long time. It is made in strips 1 to 2 inches (2.5 to 5 cm) wide. Torchon lace generally has a gimp outlining the pattern. The gimp was first used in Sweden, but now is used generally. Colored threads are occasionally used, but in general Torchon lace is white.

Torchon lace is one of the oldest laces, and is common to many lace-making regions such as Belgium, France, Italy, Saxony, Sweden and Spain. Due to its simplicity, torchon lace is generally the first lace a lacemaker learns to make, and has been since at least the 19th century. It only requires a few bobbins and uses thicker thread than other laces, which makes it easier to learn on. It is also the simplest of all the grounded laces. Beggar's lace is an alternative term for torchon lace.

Though it is one of the oldest laces, torchon lace was not made in England until the late 19th century, at which point it was made in the East Midlands, thus it is not considered an English lace. By the early 20th century, machine-made copies were being made that were almost indistinguishable from the hand-made lace.

Gallery

References

Bobbin lace